is a railway station on the Yahiko Line in the village of Yahiko, Niigata, Japan, operated by East Japan Railway Company (JR East).

Lines
Yahagi Station is served by the Yahiko Line and is 2.0 kilometers from terminus of the line at Yahiko Station.

Station layout
The station consists of one ground-level side platform serving a single bi-directional track. The station is unattended. Suica farecards can be used at this station.

History
The station opened on 16 October 1916. With the privatization of Japanese National Railways (JNR) on 1 April 1987, the station came under the control of JR East.

Surrounding area
Yahiko village hall
Yahiko Elementary School
Yahiko Junior High School

See also
 List of railway stations in Japan

References

External links

  

Railway stations in Niigata Prefecture
Railway stations in Japan opened in 1916
Stations of East Japan Railway Company
Yahiko Line
Yahiko, Niigata